"Snapshot" is a song by American drag queen, television personality, actor, musician, and model RuPaul, released as the first single from his second album, Foxy Lady (1996). Produced by Eric Kupper, it peaked at number 95 on the US Billboard Hot 100 and number four on the Billboard Hot Dance Club Play chart.

Critical reception
Larry Flick from Billboard wrote, "It has been way too long since La Ru served his many club disciples with a new anthem. Now teamed with the equally festive folks at Rhino, he makes up for lost time with a fun single that could easily match the success of his signature 'Supermodel' breakthrough. He is once again strolling up and down the runway, playfully spouting on the joys of being the life (and centerpiece) of the party. Catchy as can be, the song is supported by a bevy of cute remixes that range in tone from jittery EuroNRG to shimmy-inducing pop/house. Pick one and work it."

Music video
The accompanying music video for "Snapshot" was filmed in Los Angeles and directed by Randy Barbato and Fenton Bailey.

Track listings
 US 12" vinyl (1996) (R0 76032)
Snapshot (Kupper's Funkin Dub) (8:53)
Snapshot (Kupper's Radio Edit) (3:03)
Snapshot (Vission & Lorimer Disco-Tech) (6:22)
Snapshot (Welcome's Moody Radio Edit) (3:24)

Chart

References

1996 singles
1996 songs
RuPaul songs
Songs written by Eric Kupper
Rhino Entertainment singles